The following ferries cross or once crossed the East River in New York City.

Manhattan–Brooklyn–Queens–Manhattan

Manhattan–Brooklyn–Queens

Manhattan–Brooklyn
One of the first documented team boats in commercial service in the United States was "put in service in 1814 on a run between Brooklyn and Manhattan." It took "8 to 18 minutes to cross the East River and carried an average of 200 passengers, plus horses and vehicles." Team boats served New York City for "about ten years, from 1814-1824. They were of eight horse-power and crossed the rivers in from twelve to twenty minutes."

Manhattan–Queens

The Bronx–Queens

See also
List of fixed crossings of the East River
List of fixed crossings of the Hudson River
List of ferries across the Hudson River in New York City

References

A Compilation of the Ferry Leases and Railroad Grants Made by the Corporation of the City of New York, 1860
A Compilation of the Existing Ferry Leases and Railroad Grants Made by the Corporation of the City of New York, 1866

Brian J. Cudahy, Over and Back: The History of Ferryboats in New York Harbor

Ferries
East River
Port of New York and New Jersey
E